Jan Švub (born 20 February 1990) is a Czech male BMX rider, representing his nation at international competitions. He competed in the time trial event at the 2015 UCI BMX World Championships.

References

External links
 
 

1990 births
Living people
BMX riders
Czech male cyclists
European Games competitors for the Czech Republic
Cyclists at the 2015 European Games